John Philip Cerone (July 7, 1914 – July 26, 1996), nicknamed Jackie the Lackey, was an American mobster and boss of the Chicago Outfit during the late 1960s. He was the younger brother of mobster Frank "Skippy" Cerone, father of lawyer John Peter Cerone, and husband to the late Clara Cerone.

He was born to John Cerone Sr. and Rose Valant. During the 1950s Cerone was a chauffeur to boss Antonino "Tony" "Joe Batters" Accardo, then became the protégé of boss Salvatore "Sam," "Momo" Giancana. Cerone was part of the enforcer team that tortured and murdered loan shark William "Action" Jackson. As an Outfit enforcer, Cerone was arrested over 20 times on charges including armed robbery, bookmaking, illegal gambling, and embezzlement. Cerone became boss of the Outfit following the semi-retirements of Accardo and Joey "Doves" Aiuppa. In 1986 Cerone, Aiuppa, Carl "Corky" Civella, Angelo "The Hook" LaPietra and Carl "Tuffy" DeLuna were convicted of skimming $2 million from a Las Vegas casino. Joseph Agosto, Kansas City crime family member and a Las Vegas show producer, who produced the Folles Bergere' at the Tropicana Hotel Casino , turned state's evidence and testified against the mob bosses. Milwaukee organized-crime boss, Frank Balistrieri, was sentenced to ten years in prison in the same case, in December 1985.

Once a mob figure in Palm Springs, California, Cerone died of natural causes six days after his release from prison in 1996.

Resources

 Sifakis, Carl. The Mafia Encyclopedia: Second Edition, New York, Checkmark Books Inc., 1999
 Demaris, Ovid. Captive City, New York, Lyle Stuart Inc. 1969

1914 births
1996 deaths
American crime bosses
Cerone, John
Chicago Outfit bosses
Cerone, John
People from Palm Springs, California